Route 349 is a provincial highway located in the Mauricie region of Quebec. It runs from the junction of Route 138 in Louiseville to Saint-Didace at the junction with Route 348. In Saint-Paulin it overlaps Route 350.

Towns located along Route 349

 Saint-Didace
 Saint-Alexis-des-Monts
 Sainte-Angèle-de-Prémont
 Saint-Paulin
 Saint-Léon-le-Grand
 Louiseville

Major intersections

See also

 List of Quebec provincial highways

References

External links 
 Official Transport Quebec Map 
 Route 349 on Google Maps

349
Louiseville
Roads in Mauricie